The Circunvalación Country railway station is part of the Guadalajara light rail system in the Mexican state of Jalisco.

External links

 

Guadalajara light rail system Line 3 stations
2020 establishments in Mexico
Railway stations opened in 2020